Hamburg Public Library is located in Hamburg, Iowa, United States.  The Carnegie Corporation of New York accepted Hamburg's application for a grant for $9,000 on December 3, 1915.  It was dedicated on June 9, 1919.  The Georgian Revival style building is five bays wide with its main entrance in the center bay.  The single-story brick structure follows a simple rectangular plan.  It was listed on the National Register of Historic Places in 1983.

References

Library buildings completed in 1919
Public libraries in Iowa
Carnegie libraries in Iowa
Buildings and structures in Fremont County, Iowa
National Register of Historic Places in Fremont County, Iowa
Libraries on the National Register of Historic Places in Iowa
Georgian Revival architecture in Iowa